Pterostylis scitula, commonly known as the elegant snail orchid, is a species of orchid endemic to the south-west of Western Australia. Both flowering and non-flowering plants have a small rosette of leaves flat on the ground. Flowering plants have a single, small green and white flower with leaves on the flowering stem.

Description
Pterostylis scitula is a terrestrial, perennial, deciduous, herb with an underground tuber and when not flowering, a rosette of leaves  in diameter. The dorsal sepal and petals are fused, forming a hood or "galea" over the column. The labellum is small, narrow and not visible from outside the flower. Flowering occurs from August to September.

Taxonomy and naming
Pterostylis scitula was first formally described in 2015 by David Jones and Christopher French from a specimen collected near Moora and the description was published in Australian Orchid Review. The specific epithet (scitula) is a Latin word meaning "beautiful", "elegant", "handsome" or "pretty" referring to the "neat, elegant flowers".

Distribution and habitat
The elegant snail orchid grows in moist soil in dense scrub between Moora and Mogumber in the Avon Wheatbelt, Jarrah Forest and Swan Coastal Plain biogeographic regions.

Conservation
Pterostylis scitula is listed as "not threatened" by the Government of Western Australia Department of Parks and Wildlife.

References

scitula
Endemic orchids of Australia
Orchids of Western Australia
Plants described in 2015